Thorns is the third solo album by English vocalist Tony Martin. It was released on 14 January 2022, 17 years after Martin's previous solo album Scream, released in 2005. This record features drummer Danny Needham from Venom, former HammerFall bass player Magnus Rosén, guitarist Scott McClellan, who helped co-write the album, bass player Greg Smith, and Pamela Moore sharing vocals with Martin on the title track.

Track listing

Personnel
Tony Martin – Vocals, Guitars, Bass, Violin
Scott McClellan – Guitars
Joe Harford - Guitars
Dario Mollo - Guitars
Magnus Rosén – Bass
Greg Smith – Bass
Bruno Sa - Keyboards
Danny Needham – Drums

Guest musicians
Pamela Moore - Vocals on Thorns
Laura Harford - Voice Actor

Production
Pete Newdeck - Mixing
Harry Hes - Mastering

Charts

References

Tony Martin (British singer) albums
2022 albums
Heavy metal albums by English artists